Mario Jorge Tuane Escaff (27 July 1927 – 13 August 2017), sometimes referred as Mario Tuani, was a Chilean football player and manager.

Career
As a football player, Tuane played for Green Cross for a season.

He came to South Africa after having coached Doxa Drama in Greece, where he arrived from Chile following the World War II. He mainly worked in South Africa for some 30 years, being considered a legendary coach since he held the distinction of coaching Kaizer Chiefs‚ Mamelodi Sundowns‚ Moroka Swallows and Orlando Pirates. His record shows two league titles: First the 1979 National Professional Soccer League with Kaizer Chiefs and then the 1988 National Soccer League with Mamelodi Sundowns. In addition, he won the Mainstay Cup with Kaizer Chiefs in 1979 and Moroka Swallows in 1983.

In 1980 he coached Peñarol in Uruguay for some months, where he took with him the South African players Shaka Ngcobo and Ace Knomo, in addition to the Ghanaian player John Nketia Yawson. It was said he had been signed due to his ability to understand African players. 

In 1981 he returned to Chile and joined Palestino. As manager of Palestino, he promoted the signing of two South African players in Chilean football. While the goalkeeper David Waterson played for Magallanes, Rodney Anley played for Palestino and scored a goal what allowed the club not be relegate to the second division.

Back in South Africa in 1983, he joined Moroka Swallows and took with him Chilean players Raúl González, Eddie Campodónico and Mario Varas. From his friendship with González, it was said that Tuane promoted the joining of Mark González, the son of Rául who was born in South Africa, to the Universidad Católica youth ranks. 

The last club that he coached was African Wanderers in 1999, with Raúl González as his assistant.

Personal life
He was nicknamed El Padrino (The Godfather) and also had passion for the equestrianism.

His wife was Greek. After his retirement, he made his home in Viña del Mar, Chile.

Honours
Kaizer Chiefs
 National Professional Soccer League: 1979
 Mainstay Cup: 1979

Moroka Swalowws
 Mainstay Cup: 1983

Mamelodi Sundowns
 National Soccer League: 1988

References

External links
 Mario Tuane at PlayMakerStats
 Mario tuane at FootballDatabase.eu

1927 births
2017 deaths
Footballers from Santiago
Chilean footballers
Club de Deportes Green Cross footballers
Chilean Primera División players
Chilean football managers
Chilean expatriate football managers
Hellenic F.C. managers
Highlands Park F.C. managers
Moroka Swallows F.C. managers
Lusitano F.C. (South Africa) managers
Orlando Pirates F.C. managers
Kaizer Chiefs F.C. managers
Peñarol managers
Club Deportivo Palestino managers
AmaZulu F.C. managers
Giant Blackpool managers
Mamelodi Sundowns F.C. managers
Uruguayan Primera División managers
Chilean Primera División managers
Premier Soccer League managers
Chilean expatriate sportspeople in Greece
Chilean expatriate sportspeople in South Africa
Chilean expatriate sportspeople in Uruguay
Expatriate football managers in Greece
Expatriate soccer managers in South Africa
Expatriate football managers in Uruguay
Association football goalkeepers